Gachancipá is a municipality and town of Colombia in the Central Savanna Province, part of the department of Cundinamarca. The municipality borders Guatavita and Tocancipá in the south, Sesquilé and Guatavita in the east, Nemocón in the west and Suesca in the north.

Etymology 
The name Gachancipá comes from Chibcha and means "Pottery of the zipa".

History 
The area of Gachancipá before the Spanish conquest was inhabited by the Muisca, organised in their loose Muisca Confederation. Gachancipá, as the name suggests, was ruled by the zipa based in Bacatá.

Modern Gachancipá was founded on January 1, 1612 but the founders are unknown.

In the late 18th century Muisca scholar José Domingo Duquesne was based in Gachancipá. A school in the town is named after him.

Economy 
The economy of Gachancipá traditionally was centered around agriculture and livestock farming. In recent years flowers are cultivated in the municipality.

Gallery

References 

Municipalities of Cundinamarca Department
Populated places established in 1612
1612 establishments in the Spanish Empire
Muisca Confederation
Muysccubun